Yaacob bin Abdul Latiff (1 February 1918 – 9 September 1985) was the second Mayor of Kuala Lumpur, Malaysia since it was officially conferred the status of the city on 16 May 1972. He served for a period of 8 years. On 1 November 1980, he was succeeded by Elyas Omar.

His son, Ibrahim Yaacob is the Parti Keadilan Rakyat (PKR) candidates for Setiawangsa's parliamentary constituency during the 2008 General Election in Kuala Lumpur Federal Territory. He lost to the Barisan Nasional (BN) candidate Zulhasnan Rafique in the election.

Honours

Honours of Malaysia
 Malaya:
  Companion of the Order of the Defender of the Realm (JMN) (1958)
 Malaysia:
 Commander of the Order of Loyalty to the Crown of Malaysia (PSM) – Tan Sri (1966)
 Selangor:
  Knight Grand Commander of the Order of the Crown of Selangor (SPMS) – Dato' Seri (1975)

Places named in honour of him
 SMK Yaacob Latiff, Taman Maluri, Kuala Lumpur
 Jalan Yaacob Latiff, (formerly Jalan Tenteram), Bandar Tun Razak, Kuala Lumpur
 SK Yaacob Latif 1, Taman Maluri, Kuala Lumpur

References

Malaysian Muslims
Mayors of Kuala Lumpur
1918 births
1985 deaths
Year of death missing
Commanders of the Order of Loyalty to the Crown of Malaysia
Ambassadors of Malaysia to Thailand
Ambassadors of Malaysia to Egypt
Ambassadors of Malaysia to Indonesia
Knights Grand Commander of the Order of the Crown of Selangor
Companions of the Order of the Defender of the Realm